Rostam Rah (also Romanized as Rostam Rāh and Rustamrāh) is a village in Zalian Rural District, Zalian District, Shazand County, Markazi Province, Iran. At the 2006 census, its population was 94, in 22 families.

References 

Populated places in Shazand County